Guilherme Alvim Marinato (born 12 December 1985) or simply Guilherme is а professional footballer who plays for FC Lokomotiv Moscow as a goalkeeper. Born in Brazil, Guilherme naturalized as a Russian citizen and represents the Russia national football team.

Club career

Atlético Paranaense
He made his professional debut for Atlético Paranaense in 0–1 defeat away to Nacional Atlético Clube in Campeonato Paranaense on 13 February 2005. Guilherme Marinato had risen through the ranks at the club and played 18 league matches and three Brazilian Cup games in the 2007 season.

Lokomotiv Moscow
In August 2007, Guilherme Marinato signed a five-year contract with FC Lokomotiv Moscow, becoming the first Brazilian goalkeeper in Russian football. He was handed the number 85 shirt. In 2007, he did not play a single game for the first team, and played only three games for the reserves.

Guilherme Marinato made his official first team debut on 12 July 2009, in Russian Premier League against Tom Tomsk (0–0 home draw), since then has been first-choice goalkeeper for Lokomotiv. In 2010, Guilherme changed his jersey number from 85 to 1. He played all 30 league matches during this season. On 19 August 2010 Guilherme made his UEFA Europa League debut against Lausanne-Sport.

During the winter camp at Cyprus in February 2013 Guilherme Marinato was appointed Lokomotiv's captain by manager Slaven Bilić. In July 2013 Guilherme Marinato won monthly contest among Lokomotiv's fans and was named Player of the month. He missed six month after cruciate ligaments injury in CSKA match on 28 July 2014 and returned to first-team football only next spring. Though, this season proved to be the most successful for Guilherme at Lokomotiv, as Loko claimed bronze medals.

In March 2015, his performances once more gained him the Lokomotiv Player of the month title.

On 23 May 2022, Guilherme signed a new contract with Lokomotiv until June 2024.

International career
Guilherme Marinato was born and raised in Brazil. He gained Russian citizenship, and on 22 November 2015, he was called up to the Russia national football team for friendly games against Lithuania and France. He made his debut on the 26 March 2016 at Otkrytiye Arena, replacing fellow debutant Stanislav Kritsyuk at half time in a 3–0 win, and became the first player naturalised from outside the former Soviet Union to feature for the Russian national team. He was included in the Russia squad in UEFA Euro 2016, but did not play a single match.

On 11 May 2018, he was included in Russia's extended 2018 FIFA World Cup squad as a back-up 5th goalkeeper. He was not included in the finalized World Cup squad. Following Igor Akinfeev's retirement from the national team after the World Cup, Guilherme became the first-choice goalkeeper for the team, competing with Andrey Lunyov. Despite featuring in 9 out of 10 
UEFA Euro 2020 qualifiers with 6 clean sheets and just 8 goals conceded, as well as being named the 2020–21 RPL goalkeeper of the season, Guilherme was not called up for the final tournament in 2021.

Personal life
Marinato is fluent in Russian. On 22 November 2015, Guilherme received Russian citizenship and became eligible to represent Russia at international level.

Career statistics

Club

Honours
Atlético Paranaense
Campeonato Paranaense: 2005

Lokomotiv Moscow
Russian Cup: 2014–15, 2016–17, 2018–19, 2020–21
Russian Premier League: 2017–18
Russian Super Cup: 2019
Individual
Russian Premier League goalkeeper of the season: 2020–21

Notes

References

External links

 
 furacao.com 
 CBF 
 fclm.ru 

1985 births
Sportspeople from Minas Gerais
Russian people of Brazilian descent
Brazilian people of Italian descent
Naturalised citizens of Russia
Brazilian emigrants to Russia
Living people
Brazilian footballers
Russian footballers
Russia international footballers
Association football goalkeepers
Club Athletico Paranaense players
FC Lokomotiv Moscow players
Campeonato Brasileiro Série A players
Russian Premier League players
UEFA Euro 2016 players
2017 FIFA Confederations Cup players
Brazilian expatriate footballers